Tiengen (Hochrhein) station is a railway station in the town of Tiengen, Baden-Württemberg, Germany. The station lies on the High Rhine Railway and was opened on 15 June 1863. The train services are operated by Deutsche Bahn.

Services 
 the following services stop at Tiengen (Hochrhein):

 RB:

References

External links
 
 

Railway stations in Baden-Württemberg
Railway stations in Germany opened in 1863
Buildings and structures in Waldshut (district)